PA19 may refer to:
 Pennsylvania Route 19 (1920s)
 Pennsylvania's 19th congressional district
 Pitcairn PA-19, an autogyro produced in 1932
 Piper PA-19, a light aircraft
 U.S. Route 19 in Pennsylvania